Hithi Thajuribaa is a Maldivian romantic drama television series developed for Television Maldives. The series stars Ali Shameel, Aminath Rasheedha and Niuma Mohamed in pivotal roles. Based on the novel Avaamendhuru published by Aishath Neena, the film follows the destruction of a happy family when an islander residing in the same house links up with the tenant.

Premise
Saleem (Ali Shameel) and Asma (Aminath Rasheedha) marry despite their parent's refusal and continue to live a happy life with their three children. Asma has to undergo a severe operation and brings in her nephew, Shahula (Niuma Mohamed) to perform the daily chores in the house. Asma's operation is successful though the doctor advises the couple to refrain from having sex for a year. Shahula strongly determines to stay at Saleem's house as long as she can. Meanwhile, Saleem has a secret affair with Shahula. Realizing that Saleem is distancing from Asma, she informs Shahula that henceforth all the  work which relates to Saleem will be personally handled by Asma. Complications arise, when Asma discovers their affair and is forced to helplessly watch.

Cast and characters

Main
 Ali Shameel as Saleem
 Aminath Rasheedha as Asma
 Niuma Mohamed as Shahula

Recurring
 Arifa Ibrahim as Asma's sister-in-law
 Ibrahim Shakir as Asma's doctor
 Mariyam Shelin as Shifa
 Hawwa Enee as Hana
 Fathimath Mufliha as Zahira

Soundtrack

References

Serial drama television series
Maldivian television shows